Delphinoidea is the largest group of toothed whales with 66 genera in 6 families. The largest living member of the superfamily is the killer whale, which can reach 6 tons, while the smallest is the vaquita.

Taxonomy
Based on McGowen et al., 2019

Superfamily Delphinoidea
Family †Albireonidae
Genus Albireo
Family Delphinidae
 Subfamily Delphininae
 Genus Delphinus
 Genus Lagenodelphis
 Genus Sotalia
Genus Sousa
 Genus Stenella
 Genus Tursiops
 Subfamily Globicephalinae
 Genus †Astadelphis
 Genus Feresa
 Genus Globicephala
 Genus Grampus
 Genus Orcaella
 Genus Peponocephala
 Genus Pseudorca
 Genus Steno
Subfamily Lissodelphininae
 Genus Cephalorhynchus
 Genus Lissodelphis
 Subfamily Orcininae
 Genus †Arimidelphis
 Genus †Eodelphinus
 Genus †Hemisyntrachelus
 Genus Orcinus
 Subfamily incertae sedis
 Genus †Australodelphis
 Genus †Etruridelphis
Genus Lagenorhynchus
 Genus †Sinanodelphis
Family †Kentriodontidae
 Subfamily Kentriodontinae
 Genus Belonodelphis
 Genus Delphinodon
 Genus Heterodelphis
 Genus Incacetus?
 Genus Kentriodon
 Genus Lamprolithax
 Genus Loxolithax
 Genus Macrokentriodon
 Genus Microphocaena
 Genus Rudicetus
 Genus Tagicetus
 Subfamily Lophocetinae
 Genus Hadrodelphis
 Genus Liolithax
 Genus Lophocetus
 Subfamily Pithanodelphininae?
 Genus Atocetus?
 Genus Leptodelphis?
 Genus Pithanodelphis?
 Genus Sarmatodelphis?
 Genus Sophianacetus?
 Subfamily Kampholophinae?
 Genus Kampholophos?
Family  Monodontidae
 Subfamily Delphinapterinae
 Genus †Bohaskaia
 Genus Delphinapterus
 Genus † Denebola
 Subfamily Monodontinae
 Genus Monodon
Family † Odobenocetopsidae
 Genus Odobenocetops
Family  Phocoenidae
 Genus †Archaeophocaena
 Genus †Australithax
 Genus †Brabocetus
 Genus †Haborophocoena
 Genus †Lomacetus
 Genus †Miophocaena
 Genus Neophocaena
 Genus †Numataphocoena
 Genus Phocoena
 Genus Phocoenoides
 Genus †Piscolithax
 Genus †Pterophocaena
 Genus †Salumiphocaena
 Genus †Semirostrum
 Genus †Septemtriocetus
Familia incertae sedis
 Genus †Graamocetus
 Genus †Miodelphis
 Genus †Nannolithax
 Genus †Oedolithax
 Genus †Palaeophocaena
 Genus †Platylithax
 Genus †Protodelphinus

References

Toothed whales
Extant Oligocene first appearances